Sundt Air is a Norwegian operator of corporate jets based in Oslo. It has four aircraft used for corporate and private charter. Two Beechcraft Super King Airs are used to carry out flight inspection duties as well as charters.

Fleet

The Sundt Air fleet is:
 1 x Beechcraft B350ER (maritime patrol)
 2 × Beechcraft Super King Air 200 (charter and flight inspection duties)
 1 × Bombardier Challenger 604
 1 × Bombardier Challenger 350
 1 × Cessna Citation Sovereign

External links

Airlines of Norway
Airlines established in 1997
1997 establishments in Norway